Bethal Commando was a light infantry regiment of the South African Army. It formed part of the South African Army Infantry Formation as well as the South African Territorial Reserve.

History

Origin 
The Bethal Commando was originally established as a commando of the South African Republic (Transvaal)

Operations

With the Zuid Afrikaanse Republiek
The commando fought in the Second Boer War and was led by Commandant H.F. Grobler; it had an initial strength of 737. It fought at:

With the UDF
By 1902 all Commando remnants were under British military control and disarmed. By 1912, however, previous Commando members could join shooting associations. By 1940, such commandos were under the control of the National Reserve of Volunteers.

These commandos were formally reactivated by 1948.

With the SADF
During this era, the unit was mainly used for rural area force protection, police assistance and stock theft control.

The unit resorted under the command of the SADF's Group 12.

With the SANDF

Disbandment
This unit, along with all other Commando units was disbanded after a decision by South African President Thabo Mbeki to disband all Commando Units. The Commando system was phased out between 2003 and 2008 "because of the role it played in the apartheid era", according to the Minister of Safety and Security Charles Nqakula.

Unit Insignia

Leadership

References

See also 
 South African Commando System

Infantry regiments of South Africa
South African Commando Units
Military units and formations of the Second Boer War